Reg Date (26 July 1921 – 11 August 1995) was an Australian soccer player who plied his trade after the Second World War. Date played for Wallsend Football Club and Canterbury-Bankstown. He represented Australia in five full international matches, captaining three times.

Early life
Date was born in Wallsend to Nancy and John "Mick" Date. His father was a fisherman at Lemon Tree Passage, where Date lived until the age of eight, when he moved to live in Wallsend with his mother's parents.

Club career
Date went to Plattsburg Public School in Wallsend, being a prolific goalscorer in their youth matches. He made his debut for Wallsend Football Club in 1938 as a 16-year-old. He joined Canterbury-Bankstown in the state league in 1945. Date continued to live in Wallsend, commuting by train every weekend. In 1948, Date returned to Wallsend. In time he was coached by the great Alf Quill, Wallsend Football Club's legendary goalscorer of the inter-war years.
 
At his peak Date was an incredible goal scorer for Canterbury-Bankstown in the New South Wales Division 1, earning state and international recognition and captaining Australia in three matches against South Africa in a five-game home series against that nation; Date scoring 8 goals. (He scored another 3 in two warm-up matches for the 'B' side prior to the official tour. There was consternation when Date, for whatever reason, was not selected on international tours of New Zealand in 1948 and, most surprisingly, South Africa in 1950 but he did score in a representative match on the national side's return from the Cape for New South Wales against Australia on Saturday 2 September 1950 and did appear for the 'B' side in the famous 0–17 defeat to an English XI on 30 June 1951.

Career statistics

Club

International

Legacy
In 2000, he was selected as a member of the Australian team of the century by respondents to an RSSSF vote, beating Frank Farina into second place for the number 10 shirt.

Later life
Date worked for years running hotels in the Newcastle area. He became the publican of the Queens Arms Hotel in Maitland in 1947, moving to the Ocean View Hotel in Dudley the next year. In 1954, Date took over the Albion Hotel in Wickham, where he worked until his retirement in 1980. In a 2012 interview with The Sydney Morning Herald, his Australia teammate Joe Marston rated Date as the best Australian player that he had played with or against, adding, "Great player. Great bloke. But boy he could drink. The selectors, they never liked Reggie. He was too much of a larrikin. They couldn't handle him."

Honours
Wallsend
NSW State League: 1938, 1941, 1942, 1943, 1944, 1951, 1953
NSW State League Cup: 1942, 1944, 1950, 1952
NSW Robinson Cup: 1938, 1939 
NSW Daniels Cup: 1940, 1941, 1942, 1943, 1949, 1950, 1951, 

Canterbury
NSW  State League: 1945
NSW  State League Cup: 1946
NSW Sydney Cup: 1946

Individual
NSW Top Scorer: 1942, 1945, 1946, 1947, 1951, 1952, 1953

References

External links
 Oz Football profile

Australian soccer players
Australia international soccer players
1921 births
1995 deaths
Association football forwards
Sportspeople from Newcastle, New South Wales